Finlay Dow-Smith (born 8 July 1988), known professionally as Starsmith, is a British songwriter and producer. He co-wrote and produced "Good Thing" by Zedd and Kehlani, and "I'll Be There" by Jess Glynne which went to number one in the UK and was nominated for Best Single at the 2019 Brit Awards.

He also co-wrote and produced "Crybaby" by Paloma Faith, as well as producing "Hold My Hand" by Jess Glynne, and "Real Love" by Clean Bandit and Jess Glynne. He co-wrote and produced the majority of Ellie Goulding's debut album Lights. Following its release in 2010, it went straight to No. 1 in the UK Albums Chart. The album has gone on to sell over 2,000,000 copies worldwide. He teamed up again with  Goulding on her second number-one album, Halcyon, producing and co-writing three songs on the album.

He was nominated for Producer of the Year at the 2018 A&R Awards, as well as the Music Producers Guild Breakthrough Producer of the Year in 2011.

Career
He studied a classical music degree at the University of Surrey, majoring in performance on saxophone and graduating in 2009. He met Ellie Goulding during his final year and together they started creating what would become her debut album, which was then signed to Polydor Records a few months after he graduated. They are reportedly in the studio working on Ellie Goulding's 4th album.

Starsmith toured with Goulding in 2009 and 2010, and also played with her on Later... with Jools Holland in 2009, playing bass guitar. He is a noted instrumentalist, additionally playing piano and guitar, but his main instrument is the saxophone.

In December 2011, he was the subject of an episode of the Red Bull and Vice documentary series, The Producers. In March 2014, the track "Dead In The Water" that he co-wrote and produced with Ellie Goulding was included in the promotion and soundtrack for the film Divergent, which opened at No.1 at the Worldwide Box Office.

In 2015, he co-wrote and produced seven songs with Jess Glynne on her number one debut album I Cry When I Laugh, including the single "Hold My Hand", which spent four weeks at number 1 in the UK and sold over two million copies worldwide. In 2017, he collaborated with Paloma Faith on her number one album The Architect, co-writing and producing five songs. Their first writing session together resulted in the lead single "Crybaby". That year he also wrote songs with Jessie Ware for her album Glasshouse and with Rae Morris for her album, Someone Out There. He worked with Cloves and her longtime writing partner Justin Parker on singles from her  debut album. "Bringing the House Down", their first collaboration together, was released in early 2018 as the album's lead single.

He co-wrote and produced the lead single "I'll Be There" for Jess Glynne's second album. The song went to number one in the UK, achieving their second chart-topper, and third top 3 single together.

Songwriting and production credits

Remixography

References

External links
Starsmith at SoundCloud

1988 births
Living people
People from Bromley
British pop musicians
British songwriters
British male saxophonists
British record producers
Remixers
British composers
Alumni of the University of Surrey
21st-century saxophonists
21st-century British male musicians
British male songwriters